Huaiyuan County (Postal: Hweiyuen) is a county in the north of Anhui Province, China. It is under the administration of Bengbu city.

Administrative divisions
In the present, Huaiyuan County has 10 towns and 5 townships.
10 Towns

9 Townships

Climate

References

Bengbu